Manuel A. Zamora was a Filipino chemist and pharmacist best known for his discovery of the tiki-tiki formula against beriberi.

Personal life and education
Zamora was born on March 29, 1870 in Santa Cruz, Manila to Marciano Zamora and Martina Molo Agustin. Coming from an affluent family, he finished his primary education at the Ateneo Municipal. He then took up Pharmacy in the University of Santo Tomas (UST). Even as a student in UST, he was already engaged in various award-winning research works which culminated in his graduation in 1896, sobresaliente. Aside from this, he was also an apprentice in Botica de Quiapo where he was trained to compound and dispense medicine.

He married Baltazara Mangali with whom he had two children named Marciano and Felicidad. His granddaughter Virginia "Jennie" Zamora is a member of the executive committee of the Philippine General Hospital Medical Foundation Inc.

Zamora died on July 9, 1929.

Career
Zamora became an assistant professor of organic chemistry in UST in 1901, rising to the position of associate professor and then to full professor later on. He opened his own drugstore and laboratory at 928 Hidalgo Street in Quiapo, Manila in 1908. It was in this laboratory where he would develop the tiki-tiki formula in 1909. He got an offer from Parke-Davis in New York City for patent rights but he refused.

Research works
 "Materia Farmaceutica Animal y Mineral" (1891-1892)
 Materia Farmaceutica Animal Vegetal" (1893-1894)
 "Estudio Farmacologico de la Areca Cateru y Determinacion de Uno o Varios de sus Alkaloides"
 "Purificacion de mil Granos del Acido Sulfurico del Comercio"

Medicinal cures
 vino ye
 Vino yodo-tanico fosfatado Zamora
 Vino estimulante nutritivo
 Vino estimulante nutrivino con tiki-tiki Zamora
 Gonorrema Zamora
 Lustora
 Alis galis
 Mil flores pomade
 Elixir digestive estomacal

References

Filipino chemists
20th-century Filipino scientists
1870 births
1929 deaths
People from Santa Cruz, Manila
Academic staff of the University of Santo Tomas
University of Santo Tomas alumni